Ward County may refer to:

 Ward County, North Dakota
 Ward County, Texas
 Ward County, Queensland

County name disambiguation pages